Ídolos Brazil 2 (known as Ídolos 2007) was the second season of Brazilian reality interactive talent show Ídolos (and last aired on SBT), which premiered on March 28, 2007 with the season finale airing on August 16, 2007.

Beto Marden and Lígia Mendes returned as hosts from last year and the judging panel again consists of Carlos Eduardo Miranda, Arnaldo Saccomani, Cyz Zamorano and Thomas Roth.

Thaeme Mariôto won the competition with Shirley Carvalho as the first runner-up and Lenny Bellard finishing third.

Early Process

Regional Auditions 
Auditions were held in the following cities:

Theater Round

First Cut 
The first day of Theater Week featured the one hundred eighty-three contestants from the auditions round. One hundred and eight contestants advanced.

Chorus Line 
Divided into groups, each contestant should go on stage and sing a song a capella for the judges until they stopped them. Seventy-four advanced.

Solos 
The next round required the contestants singing solo with the option of playing an instrument. Fifty advanced to the final round. In the end, the judges take the contestants in pairs and tell them if they made the final thirty-two.

Semi-finals 
The thirty-two semifinalists were split by gender into four groups. Each contestant would then sing in their respective group's night. The top three contestants from each group made it to the finals. The girls' groups performed on May 16, 2007 and May 30, 2007, while the guys' groups performed on May 23, 2007 and June 6, 2007, with results show on the following night.

Finals

Finalists

Elimination chart

References

External links 
 Ídolos Brazil website

Ídolos (Brazilian TV series)
2007 Brazilian television seasons